Muhammad Askari Mirza (Persian: محمد عسکری میرزا), sometimes known simply as  Askari (1516 – 5 October 1557) was a son of Babur Mirza, the founder of the Mughal dynasty and Gulrukh Begum. Askari was also a general of the Mughal Army known for his role in the early Mughal conquests of India. Babur appointed him as governor of Sambhal where he ruled from 1531 to 1554. He died in 1557 while he was on a Hajj.

References
 

1516 births
1557 deaths
Mughal princes
Timurid dynasty